Conus tagaroae is a species of sea snail, a marine gastropod mollusk in the family Conidae, the cone snails, cone shells or cones.

These snails are predatory and venomous. They are capable of "stinging" humans.

Description
The size of the shell varies between 40 mm and 84 mm.

Distribution
This marine species occurs off the Philippines.

References

  L. Limpalaër & E. Monnier (2013): Cylinder tagaroae (Gastropoda: Conidae) a Valid Name for a Long Time Known Species from the Philippines - Visaya Vol. 4 n°1
 Puillandre N., Duda T.F., Meyer C., Olivera B.M. & Bouchet P. (2015). One, four or 100 genera? A new classification of the cone snails. Journal of Molluscan Studies. 81: 1-23

External links
 To World Register of Marine Species
 
 Holotype in MNHN, Paris

tagaroae
Gastropods described in 2013